Meitinger  is a German surname. Notable people with the surname include:

Holger Meitinger (born 1957), German ice hockey player
Nicolas Meitinger (born 1948), German golfer
Otto Meitinger (1927–2017), German architect and preservationist

See also
Meilinger

German-language surnames